State Route 4 (SR 4), formerly known as Inter-county Highway 4 until 1921 and State Highway 4 in 1922, is a major north–south state highway in Ohio. It is the fifth longest state route in Ohio.  Its southern terminus is at U.S. Route 42 in Cincinnati, Ohio, and its northern terminus is at U.S. Route 6 in Sandusky, Ohio.  Its path is nearly ruler-straight for many miles. Some portions of the route are still marked as Dixie Highway.  The northern portion was constructed by the Columbus and Sandusky Turnpike Company, see Turnpike Lands.

Route description
State Route 4 begins in Cincinnati, running through Middletown as well as Dayton, then joining Interstate 70, with which it runs concurrently for over three miles. The route then goes through Springfield and continues to Marion. It then travels to Bucyrus, finally heading northeast to Sandusky, where it ends.

The portion of SR 4 between High Street (SR 129) and North Fair Avenue in Hamilton is designated as the "Firefighter/Paramedic Patrick Wolterman Memorial Highway", in honor of a firefighter/paramedic for that city who died December 28, 2015, while battling an intentionally-set house fire. The two men who started the blaze were convicted of murder and arson in November 2017 and sentenced to life in prison. This portion of SR 4 passes by Wolterman's fire station.

History

In 1912 the Route ran from Sandusky to Columbus.
In 1924 the Route extended south from Columbus on former SH 5, following current US 23 alignment from Portsmouth to Waldo, and current SR 423 from Waldo to Marion.

In 1959 alignment from Dayton to Springfield rerouted and upgraded to freeway; segment through Fairborn around Wright-Patterson Air Force Base designated as SR 444.
In 1967 the segment from SR 201 to SR 444 upgraded to freeway.
In 2011 the Dayton segment was rerouted via I-75.
In 2021 the Dayton segment rerouted from Germantown Pike to Gettysburg Avenue interchange with US 35.

Future

Huber Heights safety improvements
The intersection of SR 4 and New Carlisle Pike/Lower Valley Pike in Huber Heights, between SR 235/Chambersburg Road and Interstate 70, has had at least 15 accidents between 2012 and August 2018, resulting in three fatalities and 20 injuries. The intersection, which is uncontrolled, is along a high-speed portion of SR 4 that is near-expressway in character; additionally, the median is not wide enough to allow longer vehicles such as tractor-trailers to wait there safely before making a left turn (north) from New Carlisle Pike onto SR 4. Fixes for the problem intersection, all rejected, included adding lights and signage; closing the intersection; adding a traffic light; constructing a roundabout; adding an overpass; requiring traffic from New Carlisle Pike to northbound SR 4 to instead travel southbound to the SR 235/Chambersburg Road interchange, exit and re-enter northbound; and rerouting New Carlisle Pike to Chambersburg Road. At the August 6, 2018 Huber Heights city council meeting, an engineering firm hired by the city, working in conjunction with the Ohio Department of Transportation (ODOT), proposed two alternatives. The first, a restricted crossing U-turn (RCUT) (also known as a superstreet), would prohibit left turns from New Carlisle Pike or Lower Valley Pike, and cross-traffic between the two; those movements would be accomplished via right turns onto SR 4, followed by designated median U-turns. Left turns from SR 4 to New Carlisle Pike and Lower Valley Pike would still be permitted. This alternative has an estimated cost of $1 million, with ODOT paying 80% of the cost and the city paying 20%. The second alternative, sometimes called a "basic RCUT", is similar to the first alternative, but would additionally prohibit left turns from SR 4 to New Carlisle Pike and Lower Valley Pike; those movements would be accomplished via median U-turns, followed by right turns. This alternative's estimated cost is $701,000, using the same 80%/20% cost split. A superstreet already exists along the SR 4 Bypass in nearby Butler County.

Major intersections

State Route 4 Bypass

The route runs from SR 4 in Fairfield to SR 4 in Fairfield Township north of the Hamilton city limits.

SR 4B begins at a single-quadrant roadway intersection with SR 4 (Dixie Highway) and Ross Road in eastern Fairfield. Here, the connector road is located in the northwest quadrant of the intersection. The route travels north as a divided four-lane road first crossing over a CSX railroad and intersecting Port Union Road. The next three intersections SR 4B has (from south to north: Symmes Road, Tylersville Road, and Hamilton–Mason Road) are superstreet intersections. The roadway briefly expands to three lanes in each direction between Symmes Road and Tylersville Road as it crosses over a Norfolk Southern railroad. This segment also features the Fairfield-Hamilton city boundary. After the Hamilton–Mason Road intersection, SR 4B comes to a diamond interchange with SR 129 (Butler County Veterans Highway). North of Princeton Road, the route shrinks to an undivided two-lane road, passes under an overpass carrying Millikin Road, and ends at a signalized intersection with SR 4. The entirety of SR 4B is included as a part of the National Highway System.

SR 4B was constructed in the early 1970s by ODOT to allow for easier travel between Cincinnati and Middletown. In the 1990s, the Butler County Transportation Improvement District (BCTID) was formed to help address traffic congestion along the fully two-lane bypass route. Construction started on the widening of SR 4B in 2010 which included the widening of the road from the southern terminus to SR 129, the widening of  three bridges, and the creation of three superstreet and one quadrant roadway intersections. The superstreet intersections were completed in 2011. Construction of the expanded roadway finished in August 2012 on time and on budget, at a cost of $22.8 million. The BCTID is continuing to study the option of widening SR 4B north of SR 129.

SR 4B is the first superstreet corridor in Ohio. As of April 2013, it was reported that the majority of motorists in the area did not approve of the new design, with some avoiding SR 4B entirely.

Major junctions

References

External links

004
Transportation in Hamilton County, Ohio
Transportation in Butler County, Ohio
Transportation in Montgomery County, Ohio
Transportation in Clark County, Ohio
Transportation in Champaign County, Ohio
Transportation in Union County, Ohio
Transportation in Delaware County, Ohio
Transportation in Marion County, Ohio
Transportation in Crawford County, Ohio
Transportation in Seneca County, Ohio
Transportation in Huron County, Ohio
Transportation in Erie County, Ohio